Clé Bennett is a Canadian actor. He is best known for voicing DJ, Beardo, Leonard, and Chef Hatchet (Seasons 1 - 6) from Total Drama, and his portrayal of Lemar Hoskins / Battlestar in the Marvel Cinematic Universe miniseries The Falcon and the Winter Soldier.

Career
Bennett is known for his portrayal of villain Harris Prime, on NBC's Heroes Reborn.  He is a two-time Gemini Award winner, having received honors for Best Supporting Actor in a Drama Series for The Line and Best Supporting Actor in a Miniseries for Guns. He portrayed Lemar Hoskins / Battlestar in The Falcon and the Winter Soldier series on Disney+.

Filmography

Film

Television

Video games

Awards
 Gemini Awards 2010: Best Performance by an Actor in a Featured Supporting Role in a Dramatic Program or Mini-Series for: Guns (TV mini-series) (2008).
 Gemini Awards 2010: Best Performance by an Actor in a Featured Supporting Role in a Dramatic Series for: The Line (2008, Episodes 203 and 206) (series).

References

External links
 

Living people
Canadian expatriate male actors in the United States
Canadian male television actors
Canadian male film actors
Canadian male voice actors
Black Canadian male actors
Best Supporting Actor in a Drama Series Canadian Screen Award winners
20th-century Canadian male actors
21st-century Canadian male actors
Best Supporting Actor in a Television Film or Miniseries Canadian Screen Award winners
Year of birth missing (living people)